María Elena Walsh (1 February 1930 – 10 January 2011) was an Argentine poet, novelist, musician, playwright, writer and composer, mainly known for her songs and books for children. Her work includes many of the most popular children's books and songs of all time in her home country.

Biography

María Elena Walsh was born in Villa Sarmiento, Morón, Greater Buenos Aires, to a railway worker of English and Irish descent, who played the piano and a woman of Spanish descent. As a child, she lived in a big house, where she greatly enjoyed reading and listening to music in a cultural environment. When she was 15, Walsh had some of her poems published in El Hogar (magazine) and La Nación (newspaper). In 1947, before graduating from art school, she published her first book, Otoño Imperdonable, a collection of poems which was critically acclaimed and received recognition from important Latin American writers.

After graduation in 1948, she traveled to North America invited by poet Juan Ramón Jiménez and Europe during the era of Peronism and then moved to Paris, where she spent four years in the early 1950s.  While there, Walsh performed in concerts featuring Argentine folklore with fellow Argentinean singer Leda Valladares (born 1919), forming the duo "Leda & María" and recording for Le chant du monde.

She returned to Argentina in 1956 after the Revolución Libertadora. From 1958 onwards, Walsh wrote numerous TV scripts, plays, poems, books and songs, specially dedicated to young children. She was also a successful performer, singing her own songs onstage and recording them later in albums, like Canciones para mirar, Canciones para mí and El País de Nomeacuerdo.  Juguemos en el mundo, also an album, was a satirical show for adults, which was made into a film of the same title, albeit with a story unrelated to the original stage show and songs recording. The film was based on her characters Doña Disparate y Bambuco and was directed by her partner at that time, Maria Herminia Avellaneda (1933–1997).

Her work has often contained an underlying political message, as in the song El País del Nomeacuerdo ("I-Don't-Remember Land"), which was later used as the theme song for the film The Official Story, winner of the 1985 Academy Award for Best Foreign Language Film.

During the military dictatorship (1976–83) she was a fierce opponent, her song "Oración a la justicia" (Prayer for Justice) became a civil right anthem. In an open letter she criticized the regime censorship comparing the country with a preschool country calling it "Desventuras en el Pais-Jardin-de-Infantes" (Misadventures in the Preschool Country).

In 1985 she received the title of Illustrious Citizen of the City of Buenos Aires, and in 1990 was named Doctor honoris causa of the National University of Cordoba and Illustrious People of Buenos Aires Province as well.

In 1994 she was Highly Commended for the Hans Christian Andersen Award, a prize awarded by the International Board on Books for Young People.

Walsh has been considered a "living legend, cultural hero (and) crest of nearly every childhood".

Death
María Elena Walsh died of bone cancer in Buenos Aires, aged 80, on 10 January 2011.

Personal life
Walsh's partner from 1978 until her death in 2011 was Sara Facio (born 18 April 1932), an Argentine photographer, best-known herself for having photographed, along with Alicia D'amico, various cultural personalities, including Argentine writers Julio Cortázar and Alejandra Pizarnik.

Bibliography

Books
Walsh published her first poem at the age of 15, in El Hogar magazine of Argentina. Her favorite audience was children, for whom she wrote more than 40 books. The following list includes mainly complete books but also some long newspaper articles.

Books for adults
 Otoño imperdonable (1947) – edited by Walsh at 17
 Apenas Viaje (poems) (1948)
 Baladas con Angel (poems) (1951)
 Casi Milagro (poems) (1958)
 Hecho a Mano (poems) (1965)
 Juguemos en el mundo (poems) (1971)
 La Sirena y el Capitán - 1974 ("The Mermaid and the Captain")
 Cancionero contra el Mal de Ojo (poems) (1976)
 Los Poemas (1982)
 Novios de Antaño (novel) (1990)
 Desventuras en el País-Jardín-de-Infantes (1993) (*) ("Misfortunes in Kindergarten-Country")
 Hotel Pioho's Palace (2002)
 Fantasmas en el Parque (2008)

Books for children
 La Mona Jacinta (1960)
 La Familia Polillal (1960)
 Tutú Marambá (1960)
 Circo de Bichos (1961)
 Tres Morrongos (1961)
 El Reino del Revés (poems and songs) (1965)
 Zoo Loco (1965)
 Cuentopos de Gulubú (1966)
 Dailán Kifki (novel) (1966)
 Versos para Cebollitas (1966)
 Versos Folklóricos para Cebollitas (1967)
 Aire Libre (school book) (1967)
 Versos Tradicionales para Cebollitas (1967)
 El Diablo Inglés (short stories) (1970)
 Angelito (1974)
 El País de la Geometría (1974)
 Chaucha y Palito (short stories) (1977)
 Veo Veo (1984)
 Bisa Vuela (1985)
 Los Glegos (1987)
 La Nube Traicionera (1989)

Notes:
 (*) This book reprinted her famous letter against censorship in Argentina, originally published by Clarín newspaper on 16 August 1979. 
Due to the publication of that article, Walsh herself would be censored by the Military Government of Argentina.

Discography
Walsh recorded many albums with songs for children and for adults too. Her first albums were strongly influenced by Argentine folklore, working with composer and singer Leda Valladares. 
The album Canciones para Mí was her first release as a soloist, containing the songs Canción de Tomar el Té and Manuelita la tortuga (which had been previously edited on an EP). This would become Walsh's best-known song.

as "Leda y María", with Leda Valladares
 Chant d'Argentine (1954)
 Souns le Ciel de l'Argentine (1955)
 Entre Valles y Quebradas Vol. 1 & 2 (1957)
 Canciones del Tiempo de Maricastaña (1958)
 Leda y María Cantan Villancicos (EP) (1959)
 Canciones de Tutú Marambá (EP) (1960) 6

as "María Elena Walsh"
 Canciones para Mirar (with Leda Valladares) (1962) 1
 Doña Disparate y Bambuco (EP) (with Leda Valladares) (1962)
 Navidad para los Chicos (EP) (with Leda Valladares) (1963)
 Canciones para Mí (1963) 2
 Canciones para Mirar (1963)
 El País de Nomeacuerdo (1967) 3
 El País de la Navidad (1968) ("The Country of Christmas")
 Cuentopos (1968)
 Juguemos en el Mundo (1968)
 Cuentopos para el Recreo (1969)
 Juguemos en el Mundo II (1969) 4
 El Sol no tiene Bolsillos (1971)
 Como la Cigarra (1972) 5
 El Buen Modo (1976)
 De Puño y Letra (1976)

Notes:
 1 Contains the classics El Reino del Revés (whose previous version had been released on Canciones de Tutú Marambá), Canción del Jardinero, La Vaca Estudiosa, La Mona Jacinta.
 2 This was Walsh's first album as a soloist, with the hits Canción de tomar el té, Manuelita la tortuga, El twist del Mono Liso. 
 3 Includes the songs la Reina Batata, Canción del Jacarandá (co-written with Palito Ortega).
 4 After many years of recording LP with songs for children, Walsh wrote and recorded an album for adult audiences.
 5 The song Como la Cigarra became a huge hit. The album also contains other successful songs like Carta de un León a Otro, with strong politic references.

References

External links

Biography at the Ministry of Education of Argentina (Spanish)
"María Elena Walsh y la opinión urgente", ensayistas.org; accessed 2 January 2018.
Interview with Sara Facio, escritorasunidas.blogspot.com, April 2011
 Obituaries: BA Times, ABC News, LAHT
Videos editados en 3D y otros desde Youtube (Spanish)

1930 births
2011 deaths
20th-century Argentine novelists
21st-century Argentine novelists
Argentine composers
20th-century Argentine women singers
Argentine women singer-songwriters
Argentine feminists
Argentine people of English descent
Argentine people of Irish descent
Argentine people of British descent
Argentine people of Spanish descent
Argentine children's writers
Burials at La Chacarita Cemetery
Deaths from cancer in Argentina
Deaths from bone cancer
Illustrious Citizens of Buenos Aires
Lesbian feminists
Lesbian singers
Lesbian poets
Lesbian novelists
Lesbian songwriters
Lesbian composers
Argentine LGBT singers
Argentine LGBT songwriters
Argentine LGBT poets
Argentine LGBT novelists
People from Ramos Mejía
Women diarists
Argentine women children's writers
21st-century Argentine women writers
21st-century Argentine writers
20th-century Argentine women writers
20th-century Argentine writers
Feminist musicians
20th-century Argentine LGBT people
21st-century Argentine LGBT people
Argentine women composers